Lac Île-à-la-Crosse is a Y-shaped lake in North-Central Saskatchewan, Canada, on the Churchill River. At the centre of the Y is the town of Île-à-la-Crosse, the second oldest town in Saskatchewan. The Churchill exits the north-east arm and flows east to Hudson Bay through a series of lakes. The Churchill enters at the north-west arm called Aubichon Arm or Deep River. Upstream it leads north-west to Athabasca Country passing Churchill Lake, Peter Pond Lake, Lac La Loche and on to the Methye Portage leading to Lake Athabasca.

The Beaver River comes from the south and west and enters on the east side. The headwaters of the Beaver are south-west between the upper Athabasca River and the upper North Saskatchewan River in the Lac la Biche area in Alberta. Lac Île-à-la-Crosse is reached from the south by Saskatchewan Highway 155 which follows the Beaver River. To the south-east is Lac la Plonge and to the south-west Canoe Lake. To the east are many lakes which are widenings of the Churchill.

Fur trade posts

Given its strategic location it was a natural stop for early fur trade routes. Once trade was developed, pemmican was carried up the Beaver River from the buffalo country on the North Saskatchewan. In 1767 Louis Primeau, in the service of the Hudson's Bay Company, was reported on the Beaver River which means he must have passed through the lake. In 1776 Primeau, working for Thomas Frobisher of Montreal, built a post on the lake.

In 1776-77, Peter Pond wintered here as did Thomas Frobisher. Around 1786, the Scottish explorer Alexander Mackenzie, working for Gregory & McLeod, competed with Patrick Small of the North West Company (NWC). In 1787, William McGillivray was a clerk here. In 1782-85, there were three groups of independent traders but, by 1789, they were consolidated into the NWC. Around 1790, McGillivray managed the Churchill River Department of the NWC from here. Here, in 1799, David Thompson married a thirteen or fourteen-year-old Métis daughter of Patrick Small. Unlike most "country marriages" this lasted until his death.

William Linklater of the HBC built a post in 1799. Peter Skene Ogden and Samuel Black of the NWC harassed it. In spring 1811, Peter Fidler was forced to abandon it and the Nor'westers burnt it to the ground. In 1814, the HBC built a new post at a different location. In 1817 or 1818, the NWC built a fence around it. The HBC built a third time and called its post Fort Superior. The two companies were merged in 1821. By around 1980, there was still an HBC warehouse. Most of the posts were located near the town of Île-à-la-Crosse, but either the NWC or the XY Company seems to have had a place on the west side of the mouth of the Beaver River.

See also
List of lakes of Saskatchewan

References

 Elizabeth Browne Losey, Let Them be Remembered: The Story of the Fur Trade Forts, 1999
 Arthur Morton, A History of Western Canada, no date (1940?)

External links

Île-à-la-Crosse
Memories Of Deep River
Map of Northern Saskatchewan

Lakes of Saskatchewan
Division No. 18, Unorganized, Saskatchewan